Cythereinae is a subfamily of bee flies in the family Bombyliidae. There are about 19 genera and 150 species in Cythereinae.

Genera
These 19 genera belong to the subfamily Cythereinae:

 Amictus Wiedemann, 1817 c g
 Callostoma Macquart, 1840 c g
 Chalcochiton Loew, 1844 c g
 Cyllenia Latreille, 1802 c g
 Cytherea Fabricius, 1794 c g
 Enica Macquart, 1834 c g
 Gyrocraspedum Becker, 1912 c g
 Neosardus Roberts, 1929 c g
 Nomalonia Rondani, 1863 c g
 Pantarbes Osten Sacken, 1877 i c g b
 Sericosoma Macquart, 1850 c g
 Sericothrix Hall, 1976 c g
 Sinaia Hermann, 1909 c g
 Sphenoidoptera Williston, 1901 i c g
 † Amictites Hennig, 1966 g
 † Glaesamictus Hennig, 1966 g
 † Palaeoamictus Meunier, 1916 g
 † Paleolomatia Nel, 2008 g
 † Praecytherea Théobald, 1937 g

Data sources: i = ITIS, c = Catalogue of Life, g = GBIF, b = Bugguide.net

References

Further reading

 
 
 

Bombyliidae